The TPC San Antonio Challenge at the Canyons was a golf tournament on the Korn Ferry Tour. The tournament was one of several added to the Korn Ferry Tour schedule in 2020 as part of adjustments due to the COVID-19 pandemic. It was played in July 2020 on the Canyons Course at TPC San Antonio near San Antonio, Texas. David Lipsky won the tournament by four strokes over Taylor Pendrith; both would finish the 2020–21 Korn Ferry Tour season inside the top 25 in points, thereby earning promotion to the PGA Tour.

Winners

Bolded golfers graduated to the PGA Tour via the Korn Ferry Tour regular-season money list.

See also
TPC San Antonio Championship

References

External links
Coverage on the Korn Ferry Tour's official site

Former Korn Ferry Tour events
Golf in Texas
Sports competitions in San Antonio
Recurring sporting events established in 2020
Recurring sporting events disestablished in 2020
2020 establishments in Texas
2020 disestablishments in Texas